Patrik Nyári (born 9 April 2001) is a Hungarian professional footballer who plays for Paks.

Career
On 3 August 2019 Fehérvár FC announced, that they had signed Nyári but he would continue playing for Haladás on loan for the 2019-20 season.

Club statistics

Updated to games played as of 19 December 2021.

References

External links

2001 births
Living people
Sportspeople from Szombathely
Hungarian footballers
Hungary youth international footballers
Association football defenders
Szombathelyi Haladás footballers
Fehérvár FC players
Budaörsi SC footballers
Paksi FC players
III. Kerületi TUE footballers
BFC Siófok players
Nemzeti Bajnokság I players
Nemzeti Bajnokság II players